Switch, Inc. is a company based in Las Vegas, Nevada, that develops and operates the SUPERNAP data center facilities and provides colocation, telecommunications, cloud services, and content ecosystems.

History
Switch was founded in 2000 by Rob Roy, CEO and the organization's principal inventor and chief engineer.  In 2002, Roy purchased a former Enron facility in Nevada in an auction only attended by Roy since Enron's "fiber plans were so secretive that few people even knew about the auction", with the facility which Enron invested millions of dollars into selling for only $930,000. The facility was built in a rundown area of Las Vegas near E Sahara, constructed right over the "backbone" of fiber optic cables providing service to technology companies nationwide, which Enron sought to use as a way to sell bandwidth to Internet service providers like a commodity. Six years later, in 2008, Switch was planning to build its first SUPERNAP facility which would "rival anything being built by the likes of Microsoft and Google" for $350 million, with Roy stating that he could store "four times as much gear as those companies do in his center".

Rob Roy holds 500 patents or patent-pending claims for SUPERNAP designs and engineering that have been Tier IV certified by the Uptime Institute. In 2017, the company announced it would no longer pursue certifications by the Uptime Institute, and instead planned to create a non-profit organization to control and define a new data center standard that uses 30 additional metrics and is called Tier 5 Platinum, and that they have plans to follow the new standards. Switch is a CLEC (Competitive Local Exchange Carrier) that sells all telecommunications services.

As of July 2015, half of the company's 14 top executives are women. Seventy-percent of the current workforce are veterans.

In 2015, the company became the first data center service in the U.S. to participate in President Barack Obama's American Business Act on Climate Pledge. Switch is currently constructing the first of two solar farms, which will provide renewable energy to its data centers. As of January 1, 2016, all Switch data centers are powered exclusively by clean and renewable energy. In 2016 Switch joined the WWF/WRI Renewable Buyers’ Principles.

In its 2017 report on the energy footprint of the IT sector, Greenpeace recognized Switch  for the company's use of renewable energy in its data centers. In 2020, construction started on a 555 MW solar project in Nevada, of which 127 MW is behind-the-meter at Citadel.

Data centers

In 2008, the company opened SUPERNAP 7, a  facility, its seventh data center.

Power to the data facilities will be generated through two solar generation projects, Switch Station 1 and Switch Station 2. The Switch Stations will produce 179-megawatts of power and were originally part of a joint construction project through First Solar in partnership with NV Energy. In June 2017, EDF Renewable Energy acquired the two solar projects from First Solar.

Switch has sued NV Energy for $30 million over disagreements about power price, and in 2016 Switch was allowed to switch from NV Energy to its own solar power plants at an "exit fee" of $27 million.

In January, 2015 Switch announced a $4 billion expansion plan to build a new data center campus east of Reno in Storey County. This is the first of eight planned data centers to be built at TRIC.

In order to connect its Las Vegas and Tahoe-Reno campus, Switch is building the Switch SUPERLOOP fiber network, which will connect Las Vegas to Reno through 500-miles (800 km) of fiber. The Switch SUPERLOOP will extend directly to include Los Angeles and San Francisco.

Switch's Pyramid Campus (former Steelcase Pyramid) in Grand Rapids, Michigan, was opened in May 2017. At completion, it will reach up to   making it the largest data center campus in the eastern U.S.

SUPERNAP International
In 2014, Switch formed SUPERNAP International in partnership with ACDC Fund and its two limited partners Orascom TMT Investments and Accelero Capital to build data centers based on designs from the Tier IV-rated Switch SUPERNAP U.S. facilities.  The two new SUPERNAP International campus projects under construction are located in Siziano, Italy slated to open late 2016 and the Chonburi Province, Thailand, campus opening in early 2017.

The SUPERNAP data center campus in Siziano, Italy, will be  and have 40-megawatt power distributed via two 132kV transmission paths.

The US$300 million (11 billion THB) Thailand SUPERNAP data center facility will have capacity for more than 6,000 data server racks. It will cover an area of nearly 75 rai (12 hectares) and is located 27-kilometers away from an international cable landing station linking national and international telecoms and IT carriers.

Locations
Switch headquarters are in Las Vegas, with data center facilities and Innovation Centers located in northern and southern Nevada. The firm added a campus  in Grand Rapids, Michigan, and recently announced plans to develop a more than   data center campus in Atlanta, Georgia.

Customers
Switch has hundreds of clients, including Fortune 1000 companies.   According to The Register, "organizations turn to Switch for black-ops projects, spam filtering of the most serious proportions, utility computing projects, data warehouses at casinos, modeling, online games and ordinary e-commerce".

Switch developed an over $5 trillion purchasing cooperative to allow customers to collectively purchase telecommunications and other services across all of its campuses.

Certifications and awards
Switch SUPERNAP 8 data center has received Tier IV Gold Operational Sustainability Certificate from the Uptime Institute, a Tier IV Constructed Facility Certificate and Tier IV Design Certificate. In addition, Switch SUPERNAP 9 has received a Tier IV Gold Operational Sustainability Certificate, a Tier IV Design Certificate and a Tier IV Constructed Facility Certificate.

Supercomputers
In 2014, the firm announced collaboration with Intel and the University of Nevada, Las Vegas to give university researchers access to a powerful supercomputer. iSupercomputer Cherry Creek will be housed on Switch's campus, with researchers accessing the computer through the SUPERNAP facilities' telecommunications network.

In 2017, the firm donated $3.4 million in data center services to the University of Nevada, Reno for a new supercomputer, called Pronghorn. The supercomputer will be housed in the TAHOE RENO 1 data center, and it is expected that the initial hardware installation will be completed in September 2017.

Collaborative centers
The firm has designed a  center in Las Vegas, Nevada. It partnered with the University of Nevada, Reno to develop the northern Nevada-based center in Reno which opened in September 2015. The centers are intended for collaboration between students, entrepreneurs, businesses, investors and non-profits. They are named "inNEVation Center".

The Reno center is home to the Nevada Advanced Autonomous Systems Innevation Center (NAASIC). Funded by a grant from Governor's Office of Economic Development, it hosts programs to commercialize stationary robotic and advanced manufacturing systems, unmanned aerial vehicles, driverless cars, and underwater robots.

References

Relevant patents
 U.S. Patent-Integrated wiring system and thermal shield support apparatus for a data center Patent number 8,072,780 December 6, 2011
 U.S. Patent-Server system with heat dissipation device Patent number 8,300,402 October 30, 2012
 U.S. Patent-Data center air handling unit Patent number 8,469,782 June 25, 2013
 U.S. Patent-Electronic equipment data center or co-location facility designs and methods of making and using the same Patent number 8,523,643 September 3, 2013
 U.S. Patent-Data center facility design configuration Patent number 9,198,331 November 24, 2015

External links 
 

 A Look Inside the Vegas SuperNAP, Data Center Knowledge

Networking companies of the United States
Companies based in Enterprise, Nevada
Internet mirror services
2000 establishments in Nevada
American companies established in 2000
2017 initial public offerings
Companies formerly listed on the New York Stock Exchange